Laurence J. Zastrow (born October 19, 1945) was a justice of the South Dakota Supreme Court from August 10, 1976 to 1978.

Born in Gann Valley, South Dakota, Zastrow received a B.A. from the University of South Dakota–Springfield and an LL.B. from the University of South Dakota, and served as director of the Pennington County, South Dakota, Public Defender Program from 1973 to 1976.

Zastrow was appointed to the court by Governor Richard F. Kneip, following the death of James M. Doyle. He was defeated for reelection to the court in 1978 by Frank Henderson.

References

Living people
1945 births
People from Buffalo County, South Dakota
University of South Dakota–Springfield alumni
University of South Dakota School of Law alumni
Justices of the South Dakota Supreme Court